The following is a list of the governors of the Commonwealth of Virginia. The governor of Virginia is the state's head of government and commander-in-chief of the state's official national guard. The governor has the duty to enforce state laws, and the power to either approve or veto bills passed by the Virginia General Assembly, to convene the legislature, and to grant pardons, except in cases of impeachment.

The first Constitution of 1776 created the office of governor, to be elected annually by the Virginia State Legislature. The governor could serve up to three years at a time, and once out of office, could not serve again for four years. The 1830 constitution changed the thrice renewable one-year term length to a non-renewable three-year term, and set the start date at the first day in January following an election. This constitution also prevented governors from succeeding themselves, a prohibition that exists to the present day. The 1851 Constitution increased terms to four years and made the office elected by the people, rather than the legislature. The commencement of the Governor's term was moved to the first day in February by the 1902 Constitution, and then to the Saturday after the second Wednesday in January by the 1971 and current Constitution.

If the office of governor is vacant due to disqualification, death, or resignation, the lieutenant governor of Virginia becomes governor. The office of lieutenant governor was created in 1851. Prior to that a Council of State existed; it chose from among its members a president who would be "lieutenant-governor" and would act as governor when there was a vacancy in that office.

Officially, there have been 74 governors of Virginia; the acting governors are not counted.

Colonial governors

President of the Committee for Public Safety 
Parties:

List of governors (1776–1852)

Political party
 (14)
 (40)
 (2)
 (1)
 (7)
 (1)
 (8)

Governors under the constitution of 1851
Governors are elected to one term of four years, which cannot be renewed.

See also
 List of Virginia state legislatures

Notes

References

General
 Virginia State Government Website
 Congressional Quarterly
 Virginia governors. (2000). In Congressional Quarterly (Ed.), American political leaders 1789–2000. Washington: CQ Press. Retrieved January 10, 2006, from CQ Electronic Library, CQ Voting and Elections Collection, . Document ID: amldrs-147-7136-390228. (Requires Subscription)

 National Governors Association's list of Virginia Governors

Constitutions

Specific

Lists of state governors of the United States

Governors
governor

See also
 List of Virginia state legislatures
 First ladies of Virginia